Richard S. Hodgson (born May 23, 1956) is a Canadian former professional ice hockey defenceman. He played 6 games for the Hartford Whalers during the 1979–80 season.

Career statistics

Regular season and playoffs

International

External links
 

1956 births
Living people
Atlanta Flames draft picks
Calgary Centennials players
Canadian ice hockey defencemen
Hartford Whalers players
Ice hockey people from Alberta
Kamloops Rockets players
San Diego Mariners draft picks
Sportspeople from Medicine Hat
Springfield Indians players
Tulsa Oilers (1964–1984) players